Selective Androgen Receptor Modulators or SARMs are a class of androgen receptor ligands that maintain some of the desirable effects of androgens, such as preventing osteoporosis and muscle loss while reducing risks of developing prostate cancer.  In the late 1990s, the first nonsteroidal SARM, an analog of bicalutamide, was discovered. They are intended to have the same kind of effects as androgenic drugs, such as anabolic-androgenic steroids, but be more selective in their action. At present, there are no SARMs which have been approved for therapeutic use by the U.S. Food and Drug Administration.

Comparison to testosterone

As previously mentioned, the purpose of research in relation to SARMs is to replace testosterone supplementation in disease treatment with selective androgen receptor molecules. This is due to the fact that testosterone supplementation can have adverse effects on patients, which are detailed on the testosterone page.

Thinking of testosterone as a model molecule, several SARMs have been manufactured to mimic the proven effects of testosterone on the body. For example, there have been meta-analyses conducted showing that testosterone supplementation increases fat-free mass, body mass, strength, and a decrease in fat mass. However, nonsteroidal SARMs purposefully differ in their mechanism of action, as the 5-α reduction or aromatization seen in testosterone’s mechanism is not present in these molecules.

Mechanism 
The binding of ligands to the androgen receptor (AR) results in a conformational change, this consequentially alters surface topology which will lead to tissue-specific gene regulation. This tissue-specific regulation then allows for the selective stimulation or inhibition of the AR; this requires androgen response elements, co-regulators, and transcription factors. Although the exact mechanisms still remain unclear, tissue specificity and complexity of the pathway is known to dictate the transcriptional and cellular response.

Therapeutic Application and Promise 

There has been extensive research on selective estrogen receptor modulators (SERMs) such as tamoxifen, which is used to treat breast cancer. There have been experiments using a SARMs C-6 and S-23 on male mice as a contraceptive agent. Treatment of osteoporosis has been explored as SARMs have been found to have trophic effects on bone density and mineralization. The mechanism of many SARMs may also allow for the treatment of prostate cancer through the activation of AR-induced expression profiles, cytotoxic to cancer cells with fewer negative effects than seen in traditional antiandrogen therapies. Additionally, studies done on female rats have shown that SARMs can be designed to have effects on female libido and reproductive organs. Experimental results have also raised the possibility of using SARMs as adjuncts or monotherapy for benign prostatic hyperplasia through immunomodulatory mechanisms. Also, there is a relationship between Amyloid β, androgens, and circulating testosterone levels which all can affect the course of Alzheimer’s disease; a novel SARM, NEP28 has been studied and found to increase the up-regulation of neprilysin, which suppresses the plaques. Theoretically, diseases such as Duchenne muscular dystrophy can be treated with SARMs in which mice had gained muscle mass, however, side effects such as hepatoxicity and off-target effects on genitalia limited the success of pilot studies. Cachexia is a response to a disease state or its therapy; SARMs have the potential to reverse or prevent this response while having minimal effects based on several studies performed on mice. As of 2020, there has been a clinical trial using enobosarm as co-therapy with pembrolizumab for the treatment of AR positive metastatic triple negative breast cancer.

Examples

As of 2020, only four SARMs have been clinically tested on humans; Ostarine, LGD-4033, GSK2881078, and PF-06260414. While others are still in phases of testing on model organisms such as mice.

Ostarine 
Ostarine also known as Enobosarm, GTx-024 and MK-2866 has a significant amount of anabolic activity relative to androgenic activity, which shows potential in the treatment of diseases that negatively affect muscles and bones. A common, negative effect of SARMs and other anabolic steroids is the reduction of HDL and LDL, this has been confirmed in human clinical trials when comparing Ostarine to a placebo. Additionally, in trials where 1 mg of Ostarine (or more) was administered, there was a statistically significant lowering of Sex Hormone-Binding Globulin (SHBG) and serum total testosterone levels. Alanine Transaminase (ALT), an enzyme present in the liver, has been shown to fluctuate abnormally while clinical patients were given no more than 3 mg per day. However, the elevated levels seem to be resolved after the discontinuation of the SARM.

LGD-4033 
LGD-4033, previously known as Ligandrol, currently known as VK5211 after being licensed to a different pharmaceutical company; was developed as a potential treatment to musculoskeletal degenerative diseases. The potency of a SARM can be thought of as its potential anabolic activity in relation to its androgenic activity, VK5211 has the largest ratio of clinically tested SARMs. In human trials thus far, the compound has been considered generally safe with some side effects. Similarly to Ostarine, VK5211 affected both lipid levels and testosterone levels, by suppressing HDL, luteinizing hormone (LH), and follicle stimulating hormone (FSH).

GSK2881078 
Like VK5211, GSK2881078 has been clinically tested in relation to its potential in treating musculoskeletal degenerative diseases. The SARM was found to lower HDL levels, while some reported constipation, dyspepsia, and nausea. A small percentage of women studied had elevated ALT values and some men had elevated creatine kinase levels and muscle soreness.

PF-06260414 
PF-06260414 was found to be well tolerated among the male population clinically tested. As expected with SARMs there was a decrease in HDL levels as well as an increase in ALT levels. Few participants experienced headaches, decreased appetite, dizziness, upper respiratory infection, fatigue, and anxiety.

Other 
 BMS-564,929 – Mainly affects muscle growth, intended as general treatment for symptoms of andropause

 AC-262,356
 LGD-2226 – Affects both muscle and bone
 LGD-3303
 S-40503 – Selective for bone tissue, particularly low virilization, intended for osteoporosis and may be suitable for use in women.
 S-23 – Under development as a male hormonal contraceptive
 RAD140 (Testolone)

Abandoned drug candidates 
 Acetothiolutamide – High-affinity AR full agonist in vitro, but very low activity in vivo due to poor pharmacokinetics
 Andarine ("S-4") – Partial agonist, intended mainly for treatment of benign prostatic hypertrophy
 LG-121071
 TFM-4AS-1
 YK-11

Availability
In 2013, some supplement companies began selling various SARMs as supplements, in purported violation of both the Food and Drug Administration's Dietary Supplement Health and Education Act of 1994 (DSHEA) and the intellectual  rights of the patent holders of the compounds. In 2017 it was found that many of the supplements being sold  claiming to be SARMs do not actually contain the chemical in question. In reality, only 52% of the products contained any traces of SARMs at all.

In October 2017, the Food and Drug Administration issued warning letters to three supplement companies notifying them that SARMS are classed as unapproved drugs and can cause potential adverse side effects associated including cardiovascular and liver damage.

Use in sports 
In 2015, quarterback of the Florida Gators, Will Grier, allegedly tested positive for Ligandrol, a claim that the University of Florida denies.

In 2017, Joakim Noah was banned for twenty games by the NBA for testing positive for Ligandrol.

Sean O'Malley, an American mixed martial artist who competes in the Bantamweight division of Ultimate Fighting Championship, was temporarily suspended by the Nevada State Athletic Commission in June 2019 after his sample tested positive for Enobosarm ahead of his fight against Marlon Vera at UFC 239 on July 6 in Las Vegas. 

In July 2019, tennis player Beatriz Haddad Maia from Brazil received a provisional suspension after she tested positive for selective androgen receptor modulators. 

Shayna Jack, an Australian swimmer, was forced to withdraw in July 2019 from the national squad before the world championships in Gwangju, South Korea after she tested positive for Ligandrol. 

The British men's 4x100 relay team was stripped of their 2021 Tokyo Olympic silver medal after CJ Ujah tested positive for two SARMs after the race. The banned substances discovered in his system were enobosarm (Ostarine), and S-23.

See also 
 Selective receptor modulator
 Selective estrogen receptor modulator
 Selective progesterone receptor modulator
 Selective glucocorticoid receptor agonist

References 

 
World Anti-Doping Agency prohibited substances